Bardarevo Hill ( /bar-'da-rev-ski 'h&lm/) is the ice-covered hill rising to 677 m in the north part of Marescot Ridge on Trinity Peninsula in Graham Land, Antarctica.

The hill is named after the settlements of Bardarevo in Northeastern Bulgaria.

Location
German-British mapping in 1996.

Maps
 Trinity Peninsula. Scale 1:250000 topographic map No. 5697. Institut für Angewandte Geodäsie and British Antarctic Survey, 1996.
 Antarctic Digital Database (ADD). Scale 1:250000 topographic map of Antarctica. Scientific Committee on Antarctic Research (SCAR). Since 1993, regularly upgraded and updated.

Notes

References
 Bardarevo Hill. SCAR Composite Antarctic Gazetteer
 Bulgarian Antarctic Gazetteer. Antarctic Place-names Commission. (details in Bulgarian, basic data in English)

External links
 Bardarevo Hill. Copernix satellite image

Hills of Trinity Peninsula
Bulgaria and the Antarctic